Dilophospora alopecuri is a plant pathogen infecting rye and wheat.

References

External links 
 Index Fungorum
 USDA ARS Fungal Database

Fungal plant pathogens and diseases
Rye diseases
Wheat diseases
Dothideales
Fungi described in 1849
Taxa named by Elias Magnus Fries